Bayenthal is a neighbourhood of Cologne, Germany and part of the district of Rodenkirchen. Bayenthal lies on the left bank of the river Rhine, between the district of Innenstadt to the North and Marienburg neighbourhood to the South. The borders to these are defined by the Southern Bridge (Südbrücke) and the Bayenthalgürtel of the Cologne Belt respectively. To the West, Bayenthal borders with Raderberg.

It combines the residential neighbourhoods from adjacent Marienburg with former industrial areas next to the old "Dom" brewery. Bayenthal has 10.285 inhabitants (as of 31 December 2019) and covers an area of 1,28 km2 (pop.density of 8.015 inhabitants/km2). The neighbourhood is served by Cologne Stadtbahn lines 16 and 17.

References

External links 
 official site 

Boroughs and quarters of Cologne
Rodenkirchen